The finals and the qualifying heats of the Men's 100 metres Backstroke event at the 1997 FINA Short Course World Championships were held on the last day of the competition, on Sunday 20 April 1997 in Gothenburg, Sweden.

Finals

Qualifying heats

See also
1996 Men's Olympic Games 100m Backstroke
1997 Men's European LC Championships 100m Backstroke

References
 Results
 swimrankings

B